Gawłów may refer to the following places:
Gawłów, Lesser Poland Voivodeship (south Poland)
Gawłów, Łódź Voivodeship (central Poland)
Gawłów, Masovian Voivodeship (east-central Poland)